The JRA Award for Best Sprinter or Miler is a title awarded annually by the Japan Racing Association (JRA).
Since 1987 the honor has been part of the JRA Awards.

Records
Most successful horse (2 wins):
 Bamboo Memory – 1988, 1989
 Taiki Shuttle – 1997, 1998
 Durandal – 2003, 2004
 Daiwa Major – 2006, 2007
 Lord Kanaloa – 2012, 2013
Gran Alegria – 2020, 2021

Winners

References

Horse racing in Japan: JRA Awards

Horse racing awards
Horse racing in Japan